The 2015 season is Manchester City Women's Football Club's 27th season of competitive football and its second season in the FA Women's Super League and at the top level of English women's football, having been promoted from the FA Women's Premier League before the 2014 season.

Non-competitive

Pre-season

Competitions

Women's Super League

League table

Results summary

Results by matchday

Matches

FA Cup

WSL Cup

Group stage

Knock-out stages

Squad information

Playing statistics

Appearances (Apps.) numbers are for appearances in competitive games only including sub appearances
Red card numbers denote:   Numbers in parentheses represent red cards overturned for wrongful dismissal.

Goalscorers
Includes all competitive matches. The list is sorted alphabetically by surname when total goals are equal.

Correct as of 4 October 2015

Transfers

Transfers in

Transfers out

Loans in

References

15